Daniels Parkway, originally known as State Road 876 (SR 876), runs from Tamiami Trail (U.S. Highway 41, US 41) in Fort Myers to SR 82 in Lehigh Acres. Daniels Parkway encompasses a major section of what is now County Road 876, a major east-west thoroughfare through Lee County just south of Fort Myers city limits before becoming a north-south route through Lehigh Acres and Buckingham, also encompassing Cypress Lake Drive, Gunnery Road, and Buckingham Road.

Beginning at SR 867 in McGregor, CR 876 travels east along Cypress Lake Drive through Cypress Lake to U.S. Route 41 (Tamiami Trail).  It continues east of US 41 as Daniels Parkway towards Interstate 75 and Southwest Florida International Airport.  East of Gateway, CR 876 intersects State Road 82, where it turns north and continues as Gunnery Road through Lehigh Acres before merging with Buckingham Road, which carries CR 876 north through Buckingham to its terminus with SR 80 in Fort Myers Shores.

Originally SR 876, the Florida Department of Transportation (FDOT) later relinquished all of Daniels Parkway to Lee County, though the county transferred a  portion between I-75 and a county-maintained rest area back to FDOT. However, this portion is not signed as state road.

History
Daniels Parkway, once known as Daniels Road, was originally a two-lane dirt cattle trail in the 1920s.  It served a major cattle ranch operated by Barney Daniels and his son (for whom the road is named) near the intersection of present-day Plantation Road.  Daniels Road would also serve agricultural areas farther east.  At this time, the route east of the Tamiami Trail now known as Cypress Lake Drive was also a two-lane dirt road named Radio Beam Road.  

By the mid 1970s, Daniels Road was paved from US 41 up to the Ten Mile Canal and its crossing with the Seaboard Coast Line Railroad (the present-day Seminole Gulf Railway).  By this time, construction was underway on Interstate 75, which would have an interchange with Daniels Road.  I-75 was completed through Fort Myers in 1979 and Daniels Road would be paved up to the interchange.  The route would briefly carry the designation State Road 876 before being turned over to the county a year later.  Construction of Southwest Florida Regional Airport began in 1980 which led to Daniels Parkway being expanded to a multi-lane divided road with frontage roads from I-75 east to Chamberlin Parkway (which would be the main entrance to the airport's original terminal which opened in 1983).  Daniels Parkway would be widened to a six-lane divided road from US 41 to I-75 in the early 1990s.

By 1986, Daniels Parkway was extended east of Chamberlin Parkway to serve the newly established community of Gateway.  It would be extended again in the early 2000s to State Road 82 making it a continuous route with Gunnery Road and Buckingham Road (which was previously designated State Road 82A). Gunnery Road is named for the Flexible Gunnery School, which trained fighter pilots and bomber crewmen at Buckingham Army Airfield during World War II.

Major intersections

References

876
876
Transportation in Fort Myers, Florida
876